Congress Party may refer to:

Congress Party (Barbados), a minor defunct political party in Barbados
Botswana Congress Party, a political party in Botswana
Indian National Congress, a major political party in India
YSR Congress Party, a regional political party in the state of Andhra Pradesh, India
Nationalist Congress Party, a political party of India
Congress Party for the Independence of Madagascar, a communist political party in Madagascar
Nepali Congress, a major political party in Nepal